Società Sportiva Monopoli 1966 is an Italian association football club located in Monopoli, Apulia. They currently play in Serie C, the third tier of Italian football.

Predecessor

A.C. Monopoli 

The origins of football in Monopoli go back to 1958 when was founded A.C. Monopoli.  After winning Eccellenza Apulia in the 2004–05 season it has played in Serie D/H for the 2005–06 season obtaining the promotion to Serie C2 where it played the 4 seasons following. The team did not enter Lega Pro Seconda Divisione in June 2010 and restarted from Terza Categoria, the lowest level of the Italian football.

History

A.S. Liberty Monopoli 

A new club was founded in the summer 2010 as A.S. Liberty Monopoli, after the relocation of Eccellenza club A.S.D. Liberty Bari 1909 from Bari to Monopoli.

In the 2011–12 season the team was promoted from Eccellenza Apulia to Serie D.

S.S. MonosPolis and S.S. Monopoli 1966 
In the summer 2012 the club was renamed S.S. MonosPolis, then in 2014 Società Sportiva Monopoli 1966

In the 2014–15 season won the Coppa Italia Serie D and was the finalist of the nation play off of Serie D; in the summer 2015 it was admitted to Lega Pro for involvement in the sporting fraud of several teams that were, as a consequence, relegated. Since then, Monopoli has played in what is now known as Serie C.

Colors and badge 

Its colors are white and green.

Current squad 
.

Out on loan

Honors 
 Coppa Italia Serie D
 Champions: 2014–15

References

Notes

External links 

 Official website
 Bad Boys'87 Official website

 
Football clubs in Apulia
Association football clubs established in 1966
Italian football clubs established in 1966